The 38th Light Anti-Aircraft Brigade (38 AA Bde) was an air defence formation of Britain's Territorial Army formed just before the Second World War, which protected London and Southern England during the Blitz and later converted into an infantry formation for the liberation of Europe.

Origins
The brigade headquarters was formed on 28 September 1938 by duplicating the 26th (London) Anti-Aircraft Brigade at the Duke of York's Headquarters in Chelsea, London, as part of the expansion of Britain's Anti-Aircraft (AA) defences before the Second World War. The brigade was composed of searchlight units of the Royal Artillery (RA) and Royal Engineers (RE) and formed part of 1st AA Division, which came under Anti-Aircraft Command the following year. The first brigade commander was Brigadier W.T.O. Crewdson (appointed 28 September 1938).

Mobilisation
The deterioration in international relations during 1939 led to a partial mobilisation of the TA in June, after which a proportion of TA AA units manned their war stations under a rotation system known as 'Couverture'. Full mobilisation of AA Command came in August 1939, ahead of the declaration of war on 3 September 1939. At this time the brigade had the following order of battle:

 26th (London) Anti-Aircraft Battalion (London Electrical Engineers), RE (TA) – from 26 AA Bde
 HQ, 303, 321 and 339 AA Companies at Duke of York's HQ, Chelsea
 301 Company at Shepherd's Bush
 27th (London) Anti-Aircraft Battalion (London Electrical Engineers), RE (TA) – from 26 AA Bde
 HQ at Streatham
 304, 305, 306 and 390 AA Companies at Westminster
 75th (Middlesex) Searchlight Regiment, RA (TA) – formed May 1939
 HQ and 470, 471, 472 and 473 S/L Batteries at Cowley, London
 38th AA Brigade Company, Royal Army Service Corps

Blitz

In August 1940, the Royal Engineers AA battalions were transferred to the Royal Artillery and were termed Searchlight Regiments. By now, the 27th (London Electrical Engineers) had been transferred to 47 AA Bde covering Southampton, and had been exchanged with 35th (1st Surrey Rifles) Searchlight Regiment, Royal Artillery. In October, 38 AA Bde was joined by the newly raised 79th Searchlight Regiment, Royal Artillery.

During the Blitz of 1940–41, 38 Light AA Bde provided the searchlight component of 1 AA Division, directing the Heavy (HAA) and Light (LAA) anti-aircraft guns defending London. 1st AA Division had established a control centre at the disused Brompton Road tube station, with an elaborate network of dedicated telephone lines linking the AA sites across the Inner Artillery Zone (IAZ), including many isolated searchlight positions. The London IAZ extended from Cheshunt and Dagenham in the east to Bexley and Mitcham in the south and to Richmond and Northolt in the west, with three brigades of guns deployed. Superimposed across the IAZ were the 73 searchlight sites controlled by 38th AA Bde.

In the absence of inland radar coverage, 1st AA Division's Chief Signals Officer, Lt-Col G.C. Wickens, devised a system of 14 fixed base-lines of sound locators to detect night raids approaching the IAZ. These were linked by automatic telephone equipment to the Brompton operations room, where the angular plots were resolved to indicate grid squares where the HAA guns in range could fire an unseen barrage. Detachments of 75th Searchlight Regiment from 38th AA Bde were trained to operate the base lines. This 'Fixed Azimuth' system came into action in June 1940, in time for the opening of the night Blitz on London. It was later replaced as searchlight control (SLC) and gunlaying (GL) radar systems were introduced.

However, the performance of the AA defences in the early weeks of the Blitz was poor. AA Command moved 108 HAA guns to the IAZ from other divisions, and arranged 'fighter nights' when the guns remained silent and Royal Air Force (RAF) night fighters were allowed to operate over London with the searchlights. Gun-laying (GL) radar, modern sound-locators and larger (150 cm) searchlights were introduced as rapidly as possible, and by February 1941 Searchlight Control (SLC or 'Elsie') radar  began to be issued, replacing the fixed azimuth system. The number of raiders shot down steadily increased until mid-May 1941, when the Luftwaffe scaled down its attacks.

Order of Battle 1940–41

The composition of 38 LAA Bde during this period was as follows:

 26th (LEE) S/L Rgt
 301, 302 S/L Btys – attached to 8 AA Division until Summer 1941
 321, 339 S/L Btys
 35th (First Surrey Rifles) S/L Rgt – to 5 AA Division Summer 1941 
 340, 341, 343 S/L Btys
 342 S/L Bty (attached to 5 AA Div)
 75th (Middlesex) S/L Rgt – converted into 75th LAA Rgt February 1941 and joined 8 AA Division
 79th S/L Rgt
 502, 503, 504 S/L Btys

Mid-War
The Blitz ended in May 1941, but there were occasional raids thereafter and AA Command continued to strengthen its defences. Newly formed units joining AA Command were increasingly 'mixed' ones into which women of the Auxiliary Territorial Service were integrated. AA Command had a critical shortage of Light AA gun (LAA) units, and began a process of converting some S/L units to the role. At the same time, experienced units were posted away for service overseas. This led to a continual turnover of units, which accelerated in 1942 with the preparations for Operation Torch.

The AA defences of Southern England were severely tested in the summer of 1942 by the Luftwaffe's 'hit-and-run' attacks along the South Coast, and there was much reorganisation, accounting for some of the turnover of units listed earlier. LAA units waiting to go overseas were sometimes lent back to AA Command to deal with the hit-and-run raiders.

Order of Battle 1941–42

From the autumn of 1941 onwards, the composition of 38 LAA Bde was as follows:
 26th (LEE) S/L Rgt – became Mixed July 1942; to 2 AA Group November 1942
 301, 302, 321, 339 S/L Btys
 63rd (Queens) S/L Rgt, RA (TA) – joined Autumn 1941 from 5 AA Division; converted into 127th (Queens) LAA Rgt (with 416,420, 439 and 440 LAA Btys) January 1942 and transferred to 8 AA Division July 1942
 438, 439, 440, 524 S/L Btys
 79th S/L Rgt
 342 S/L Bty – from 35th (1st Surrey Rifles) S/L Rgt by May 1942; became Mixed July 1942
 502, 503, 504 S/L Btys
 141st LAA Rgt – new unit formed July 1942; to 2 AA Group November 1942
 451, 456, 466, 467 LAA Btys
 38 AA Bde Mixed Signal Office Section – part of 1 Company, 1 AA Division Mixed Signal Unit, Royal Corps of Signals (RCS)

Later war
A reorganisation of AA Command in October 1942 saw the abolition of its hierarchy of divisions and corps, which were replaced by a single tier of AA Groups more closely aligned with the organisation of RAF Fighter Command. 38 AA Brigade was assigned to a new 1 AA Group covering London, and in November was reorganised as an HAA and LAA gun brigade rather than as a 'Light' AA brigade primarily controlling searchlights. In January 1943 the brigade came under the command of 2 AA Group covering South East England outside London.

Order of Battle 1942–44

During this period the brigade was constituted as follows (temporary attachments omitted):
 100th HAA Rgt – joined December 1942; left AA Command January 1943, later to Allied invasion of Sicily (Operation Husky)
 304, 305, 321 HAA Btys
 105th HAA Rgt – left December 1942;  later to 21st Army Group
 326, 330, 333 HAA Btys
 131st HAA Rgt – from 4 AA Group May 1943; disbanded August 1943
 310, 368, 376, 428 HAA Btys
 174th HAA Rgt – from 3 AA Group April 1943; to 21st Army Group May 1943
 249, 331, 348 HAA Btys
 183rd (M) HAA Rgt – new unit formed October 1942
 564, 591, 608 (M) HAA Btys
 590 (M) HAA Bty – to 137th (M) HAA Rgt early 1943
 640 (M) HAA Bty – new battery joined early 1943
 71st LAA Rgt – left December 1942; later to 21st Army Group
 208, 209, 215 LAA Btys 
 75th (Middlesex) LAA Rgt – rejoined December 1942; left AA Command January 1943, later to Operation Husky
 233, 234, 303 LAA Btys
 84th LAA Rgt – from 35 AA Bde April 1943; to 5 AA Bde August 1943
 201, 251, 448, 461 LAA Btys
 97th LAA Rgt – to 2 AA Group December 1942
 221, 232, 301, 480 LAA Btys

 143rd LAA Rgt – from 71 AA Bde August 1943; to 102 AA Bde April 1944
 403, 410, 413 LAA Btys
 484 LAA Bty – disbanded by March 1944
 79th S/L Rgt – to 47 AA Bde by March 1944
 502, 503, 504 S/L Btys 
 93rd (M) S/L Rgt – new unit formed October 1942; to 47 AA Bde by March 1944
 301 (M), 342 (M), 495 S/L Btys
 20th (M) AA 'Z' Rgt – equipped with Z Battery rocket-launchers; to 3 AA Group April 1943
 194, 198 (M) Z Btys – left January 1943
 111, 143, 220 (M) Z Btys – joined January 1943
 38 AA Bde Mixed Signal Office Section – initially part of 1 Mixed Signal Company, RCS, 1 AA Group, then 2 AA Group

Operations Overlord and Diver
By early 1944 AA Command was being forced to release manpower to 21st Army Group for the planned Allied invasion of continental Europe (Operation Overlord), and a number of AA batteries, regiments and formations had to be disbanded or merged. At the end of April 1944, 38 AA Bde consisted solely of 183rd (M) HAA Rgt and 22 AA Area Mixed Rgt (as 'Z' regiments were now termed). However, AA Command now brought in additional units from other parts of the UK to defend the Overlord embarkation ports. 47 AA Brigade in the Southampton area of 2 AA Group was disbanded and 38 AA Bde took over much of its responsibilities, once again taking control of a number of S/L units across South East England.

Shortly after D-Day, the Germans began launching V-1 flying bombs, codenamed 'Divers', against London. These presented AA Command's biggest challenge since the Blitz. Defences had been planned against this new form of attack (Operation Diver), but it presented a severe problem for AA guns, and after two weeks' experience AA Command carried out a major reorganisation. In August, 38 AA Bde was transferred to the command of 6 AA Group, which had earlier been brought from Scotland to defend the Overlord build-up in the Portsmouth–Solent area. It returned to 2 AA Group in December.

Order of Battle 1944
During the rest of 1944, 38 AA Brigade's composition was as follows:
 179th (M) HAA Rgt – from 4 AA Group May 1944; to 3 AA Group November 1944
 584, 606, 607 (M) HAA Btys
 183rd (M) HAA Rgt – to 102 AA Bde May 1944
 564, 591, 608, 640 (M) HAA Btys
 88th LAA Rgt – from 4 AA Group May 1944; to 102 AA Bde July 1944
 178, 289, 293 LAA Btys
 147th LAA Rgt – from unbrigaded December 1944; left January 1945
 492, 493, 495 LAA Btys
 28th (Essex) S/L Rgt – from 47 AA Bde June 1944
 309/311, 312, 438 S/L Btys
 38th (King's Rgt) S/L Rgt – from 27 (Home Counties) AA Bde May, returned June 1944
 350, 351, 352 S/L Btys
 50th (Northamptonshire Rgt) SL Rgt – from 47 AA Bde June 1944
 401, 402, 403 S/L Btys
 61st (South Lancashire Rgt) S/L Rgt – from 27 (Home Counties) AA Bde May, returned June 1944
 432, 433, 434 S/L Btys
 93rd (M) S/L Rgt – returned from 47 AA Bde June 1944; to 1 AA Group January 1945
 301, 342, 495 S/L Btys
 22nd AA Area Mixed Regiment – joined April 1944; left January 1945
 194, 198 (M) Z Btys

By October 1944, the brigade's HQ establishment was 10 officers, 8 male other ranks and 25 members of the ATS, together with a small number of attached drivers, cooks and mess orderlies (male and female). In addition, the brigade had a Mixed Signal Office Section of 5 male other ranks and 19 ATS, which was formally part of the Group signal unit.

Conversion

By the end of 1944, 21st Army Group was suffering a severe manpower shortage, particularly among the infantry.  At the same time the German Luftwaffe was suffering from such shortages of pilots, aircraft and fuel that serious aerial attacks on the United Kingdom could be discounted. In January 1945 the War Office began to reorganise surplus AA and coastal artillery regiments in the UK into infantry battalions, primarily for line of communication and occupation duties in North West Europe, thereby releasing trained infantry for frontline service.

A number of AA Brigade HQs in 2 AA Group were also converted: on 22 January 1945, HQ 38 AA Bde was converted into 304th Infantry Brigade under Brigadier C.A.H. Chadwick with the following units under command:
 630th (Essex) Infantry Regiment, RA, formed by 28th (Essex) S/L Rgt (see above)
 637th (Northamptonshire Regiment) Infantry Regiment, RA, formed by 50th (Northamptonshire Regiment) S/L Rgt (see above)
 638th (Royal Northumberland Fusiliers) Infantry Regiment, RA, formed by 53rd (Royal Northumberland Fusiliers) Searchlight Regiment, Royal Artillery.

After infantry training, the brigade went to Norway in June 1945 to help oversee the surrender of the German occupying forces there.

Postwar
When the TA was reformed in 1947, 38 AA Bde was renumbered 64 AA Brigade, with the following order of battle:
 451 (Chelsea) HAA Regiment
 497 (Hammersmith) HAA Regiment
 499 (Mixed) HAA Regiment (Kensington)
 562 Searchlight Regiment (formerly 27 (London Electrical Engineers) S/L Regt)
 570 LAA Regiment (1st Surrey Rifles) (formerly 35 (1st Surrey Rifles) S/L Regt)

When AA Command was disbanded in March 1955 the brigade was placed into suspended animation on 31 October, and formally disbanded at the end of 1957.

Footnotes

Notes

References
 Basil Collier, History of the Second World War, United Kingdom Military Series: The Defence of the United Kingdom, London: HM Stationery Office, 1957.
 Maj L. F. Ellis, History of the Second World War, United Kingdom Military Series: Victory in the West, Vol II: The Defeat of Germany, London: HM Stationery Office, 1968/Uckfield: Naval & Military, 2004, .
 Gen Sir Martin Farndale, History of the Royal Regiment of Artillery: The Years of Defeat: Europe and North Africa, 1939–1941, Woolwich: Royal Artillery Institution, 1988/London: Brasseys, 1996, .
 J.B.M. Frederick, Lineage Book of British Land Forces 1660–1978, Vol II, Wakefield, Microform Academic, 1984, .
 
 Norman E.H. Litchfield, The Territorial Artillery 1908–1988 (Their Lineage, Uniforms and Badges), Nottingham: Sherwood Press, 1992, .
 Gen Sir Frederick Pile's despatch: "The Anti-Aircraft Defence of the United Kingdom from 28th July, 1939, to 15th April, 1945" London Gazette 18 December 1947
 Brig N.W. Routledge, History of the Royal Regiment of Artillery: Anti-Aircraft Artillery 1914–55, London: Royal Artillery Institution/Brassey's, 1994, .

External sources
 British Army units from 1945 on
 British Military History
 Orders of Battle at Patriot Files
 Land Forces of Britain, the Empire and Commonwealth (Regiments.org)
 The Royal Artillery 1939–45
 Graham Watson, The Territorial Army 1947

Military units and formations established in 1938
Air defence brigades of the British Army
Anti-Aircraft brigades of the British Army in World War II
Military units and formations disestablished in 1945
Military units and formations in London
Military units and formations in Chelsea, London